"'Somehow, Satan Got Behind Me" is the twenty-first episode of the second season of the American crime-thriller television series Millennium. It premiered on the Fox network on May 1, 1998. The episode was written and directed by Darin Morgan, and featured guest appearances by Bill Macy, Dick Bakalyan and Alex Diakun.

In this episode, a group of demons convene in a doughnut shop to share stories of tempting and damning humans. However, their stories all seem to include one mysterious figure who can see them for who they really are—Frank Black (Lance Henriksen).

"Somehow, Satan Got Behind Me" marks Morgan's second and last script for the series, and parodies his earlier difficulties writing for The X-Files. The episode has received mixed to positive reviews, and earned Morgan a Bram Stoker Award for Best Screenplay nomination in 1999.

Plot
Four elderly men meet for coffee late at night. The fourth to arrive is hostile to the waiter, who secretly urinates in the man's coffee. The man, Abum (Dick Bakalyan), realizes this, and the group share a laugh over it, during which they are revealed to actually be demons.

One of them, Blurk (Bill Macy), complains that there are no strong personalities in this century. He tells a story of Perry, a man he met hitch-hiking, who he molded into a serial killer over encouraging conversations. Perry sought to emulate Johnny Mack Potter, the country's most prolific killer, and to break his record number of murders. As Perry drew level with Potter's figure, Blurk grew bored accompanying him on the "mundane" murders of prostitutes and vagrants. Blurk gave an anonymous tip to the police that leads to Perry's arrest; one of the men present at the arrest—offender profiler Frank Black (Lance Henriksen)—seems to see through Blurk's human disguise. In prison, Perry is murdered by his cellmate Johnny Mack Potter, reclaiming his record.

Abum tells another story, which he believes shows that mankind no longer needs demonic temptation to be damned. Abum followed an everyman figure called Brock, watching his grindingly repetitive life. Brock visited a strip club often but without joy, which led Abum to believe he no longer took pleasure from sinning. One day, Abum added an additional irritation to Brock's life, posing as a traffic warden and giving him a ticket. This was enough to drive Brock to suicide. However, during this time, Abum also encountered Black, who again saw his demonic nature.

Greb (Alex Diakun) shares his tale, of a television censor called Waylon Figgleif. Figgleif's overzealous approach to censorship leads Greb to try pushing his limits. Greb assumed the form of a small demonic baby and reveals himself to Figgleif, who breaks down and starts attempting to censor everyday life. Greb repeats this trick, and encourages Figgleif to go on a killing spree—Figgleif takes a gun, bursts onto the taping of a science-fiction show about alien abduction, and kills several actors. Greb's methods and effectiveness are dismissed until he reveals the story's epigram. Figgleif's spree was caught on camera, and broadcast by another network as a found footage special. However, Greb also notes that he too was spotted by Black during this.

The fourth devil, Toby (Wally Dalton), is convinced that Black really does know that they are demons. Toby also recounts his story, in which he begins to feel ennui at his failure to damn humans for some time. He meets and courts an aging stripper, Sally, who falls in love with him.  Their relationship blossomed, despite her having seen his true demonic form. One day Toby leads her to believe he is about to propose to her, before instead curtly insulting and breaking up with her. He later visited her home to find police investigating her suicide—a successful damnation. However, he also encounters Black, who sees his true nature. Instead of recoiling or reacting, Black simply tells Toby that he sees how lonely he must be.

Toby's story affects all the gathered demons, who realize how lonely they really are. As they get up to leave, Abum praises the shop's coffee and briefly reveals his true form to the waiter.

Production

"Somehow, Satan Got Behind Me" is the second, and last, episode of Millennium to have been written by Darin Morgan, who also directed the episode. Morgan had previously written and directed "Jose Chung's Doomsday Defense" earlier in the season. Morgan also served as a consulting producer for the season, and is the younger brother of Glen Morgan, an executive producer for the series.

Morgan's script contains several references to his time as a writer for Millennium sister show, The X-Files. One of Morgan's episodes for that series, "War of the Coprophages", had come under heavy criticism by the standards and practices department at parent network Fox, who took exception to the initial script's heavy use of words such as "crap" to refer to the excrement that episode's cockroaches fed upon. Morgan attacked and parodied this approach with one of the tales in "Somehow, Satan Got Behind Me", with a network censor again targeting the use of the word "crap" and storming onto the set of a show resembling The X-Files being taped, featuring lookalikes of Fox Mulder and Dana Scully with theme music very similar to that series' playing in the background. The episode also contains a version of the dancing baby animation that was popular at the time, parodying its use on the series Ally McBeal.

Guest star Alex Diakun had previously appeared in the first season episode "Lamentation" in an unrelated role; while Dan Zukovic, who played network censor Waylon Figgleif, had also appeared in a small role in "Jose Chung's Doomsday Defense".

Broadcast and reception

"Somehow, Satan Got Behind Me" was first broadcast on the Fox network on May 1, 1998. The episode earned a Nielsen rating of 5.7 during its original broadcast, meaning that  of households in the United States viewed the episode. This represented approximately  households, and left the episode the eightieth most-viewed broadcast that week.

Morgan's script for the episode earned him a Bram Stoker Award nomination in 1999, for Best Screenplay; the award was won jointly by Bill Condon for Gods and Monsters and Alex Proyas, David S. Goyer and Lem Dobbs for Dark City.

The episode received mixed to positive reviews from critics. The A.V. Club Zack Handlen rated the episode an A, calling it "maybe the best hour of television Millennium ever produced". Handlen felt that the episode's "disarmingly simple" premise belied its depth, and praised Morgan's script as perhaps the writer's best work. Bill Gibron, writing for DVD Talk, rated the episode 3.5 out of 5, calling it "a very fun, very irreverent respite for the series". Gibron felt positively about the episode's dialogue and humor, and praised it for its self-parodying elements. Robert Shearman and Lars Pearson, in their book Wanting to Believe: A Critical Guide to The X-Files, Millennium & The Lone Gunmen, rated "Somehow, Satan Got Behind Me" two stars out of five, finding that it fit poorly with the tone of the series. Shearman felt that the episode was "self-indulgent and irrelevant at worst, and at best only sporadically funny".

Notes

Footnotes

References

External links
 

Millennium (season 2) episodes
1998 American television episodes